This is a list of Adidas sponsorships.

American football 

  Aaron Rodgers
  Von Miller
  Kendall Wright
  Alvin Kamara
  JuJu Smith-Schuster 
  Patrick Mahomes
  Anthony Johnson
  DeAndre Hopkins 
  Tyler Lockett
  Jalen Ramsey
  Derwin James          
  Adam Thielen
  Tua Tagovailoa
  Eddie Jackson
 Garret Wilson

Football

Adidas produces the kits of many association football teams around the world, as well as producing the balls used in the UEFA Champions League and the Women's Champions League matches and the UEFA Euro, FIFA World Cup and the Women's World Cup tournaments since 1970.

Competitions

FIFA World Cup

UEFA European Championship

Africa Cup of Nations

Olympic Games

Adidas is also the official ball supplier for the following competitions:

 FIFA
 National team competitions
 FIFA World Cup
 FIFA Women's World Cup
 FIFA U-20 World Cup
 FIFA U-20 Women's World Cup
 FIFA U-17 World Cup
 FIFA Futsal World Cup
 FIFA Beach Soccer World Cup
 Club competitions
 FIFA Club World Cup
 FIFA Youth Cup
  UEFA
 National team competitions
 UEFA European Championship
 UEFA Nations League
 UEFA U-21 Championship
 UEFA U-19 Championship
 UEFA U-17 Championship
 UEFA Futsal Championship
 Club competitions
 UEFA Champions League
 UEFA Super Cup
 UEFA Women's Champions League
 UEFA Youth League
 UEFA Futsal Champions League

Domestic leagues and cups

  Primera División
  Austrian Bundesliga
  First Division
  German Football Association
 DFB-Pokal
 3. Liga
 Regionalliga
  Subroto Cup
  J. League
  K League
  Primera División 
  División Intermedia
  Ekstraklasa
  Fortuna Liga
  Royal Spanish Football Federation
 Copa del Rey
 Supercopa de España
 Primera Federación
 Segunda Federación
 Tercera Federación
  Süper Lig 
  Major League Soccer

Referees
Adidas is also the official referee kits supplier for the leagues :

The company has supplied the ball for the UEFA European Championship ever since 1984, starting with the Tango Italia, and also produces the Finale ball for use in the UEFA Champions League and the Women's Champions League.

International confederations
 FIFA
   UEFA (except women's national team competitions, UEFA Europa and Europa Conference Leagues)

National teams

Africa

Asia

 (women's)

Europe

North America

Oceania

South America

Non-national representative teams 

   (From 2023/24 season)

Club teams

Africa

 Cameroon
  Union Douala
 Egypt
  Al Ahly
  El Ittihad Alexandria
  El Gouna
  Al Mokawloon Al Arab
 Libya
  Al Ahli
 Mauritius
  ASPL 2000
 South Africa
  Orlando Pirates
 Uganda
  Busoga United
  Onduparaka

Asia

 Australia
  Sutherland Sharks FC
 Hong Kong
  Eastern
  Lee Man 
  HKFC
 Iraq
  Al-Quwa Al-Jawiya
 Japan
  Albirex Niigata
  Machida Zelvia
  Matsumoto Yamaga
  Vegalta Sendai
  Yokohama F. Marinos
 Jordan
 Shabab Al-Aqaba Club
 Lebanon
  Tadamon
  Al-Ahli Saida
  Salam Sour
Macau
  Windsor Arch Ka I
 Nepal
  Kathmandu Rayzrs
  Three Star Club
Oman
  Al-Mussanah Club
  Al-Seeb Club
 South Korea
  Jeonbuk Hyundai Motors
  Ulsan Hyundai
 Singapore
  Balestier Khalsa
 United Arab Emirates
  Gulf United FC
 Al Dhafra
  Sharjah
 Uzbekistan
  Pakhtakor Tashkent
  FC Nasaf

Europe

 Austria
  TSV Hartberg
 Belarus
  BATE Borisov
  FC Torpedo-BelAZ Zhodino
 Belgium
  Eupen
  Standard Liege
 Bulgaria
  CSKA 1948 Sofia
 Croatia
  Dinamo Zagreb
 Cyprus
  Anorthosis  
 Czech Republic
  Dukla Prague
  Fastav Zlín
  Mladá Boleslav
  Sigma Olomouc
 Sparta Prague
 Denmark
  Copenhagen
  Lyngby
 England
  Accrington Stanley (Until 2022/23 season)
  Arsenal
  Crawley Town
  Fulham
  Halifax Town
  Leeds United 
  Leicester City
  Manchester United
  Solihull Moors
  Woking FC
 Estonia
  Levadia Tallinn
  Nõmme Kalju
 Finland
  HJK
  Ilves
  SJK
 France
  Ajaccio
  FC Annecy
  Bastia
  Bordeaux
  FC Borgo
  Brest
  SO Cholet
  Le Puy
  Lyon 
  Paris FC
  Rodez AF
  Strasbourg
  USL Dunkerque
  FC Versailles
  Villefranche Beaujolais
 Faroe Islands
  Argja Bóltfelag
  B36 Tórshavn
  HΒ Tórshavn
  ÍF
  KÍ
  Skála
  Víkingur 
 Germany
  FC Bayern Munich
  1. FC Union Berlin
  FC Bayern Alzenau
  Viktoria Aschaffenburg
  SV Bergisch Gladbach 09
  Fortuna Dusseldorf
  1. FC Nurnberg
  Hamburg SV 
  Heider SV
  FC 08 Homburg
  FV Illertissen
  FC Memmingen
  FK Pirmasens
  1. FC Saarbrücken
  FC Schalke 04 
  1. FC Schweinfurt 05
  SpVgg Unterhaching
 Greece
  Olympiacos
  Panathinaikos (From 2023/24 season)
  Aris Thessaloniki F.C.
 Hungary
  DEAC
  Debrecen
  Dorog
  Fehérvár
  Győri ETO
  Kisvárda
  Mezőkövesd
  Szombathelyi Haladás
  Vasas
 Ireland
  Cork City
 Italy
  Alessandria
  Castellanzese
  Cerignola
  Foggia
  Juventus
  Lavagnese
  Pisa
  Roma  (From 2023/24 season)
 Kazakhstan
  Aktobe
  Astana
  Tobol
  Zhetysu
 Latvia
  Liepāja
  Ventspils
 Luxembourg
  Fola Esch
  Jeunesse Esch
 Moldova
  Sheriff Tiraspol
 Montenegro
  Buducnost Podgorica
  Titograd
 Netherlands
  Ajax
  Feyenoord (Until 2022/23 season)
 Norway
  Molde FK 
  Rosenborg
  Vålerenga
 Poland
  Arka Gdynia
  Bruk-Bet Termalica Nieciecza
  Chojniczanka Chojnice
  Legia Warsaw
  Lechia Gdańsk
  ŁKS Łódź
  Miedź Legnica
  Pogoń Grodzisk Mazowiecki
  Wisła Płock
  Górnik Łęczna
 Portugal
  Benfica
 Romania
  Universitatea Cluj
  Sepsi Sfântu Gheorghe
  Steaua București
 Russia
  Lokomotiv Moscow
  Arsenal Tula
  Orenburg
 Scotland
  Celtic F.C.
  Aberdeen
  Cove Rangers
  Hamilton Academical
  Peterhead
 Serbia
  Čukarički
 Slovakia
  Ružomberok
  Senica
  Slovan Bratislava
  Spartak Trnava
  Železiarne Podbrezová
  Zemplín Michalovce
 Slovenia
  Maribor
  Mura
 Spain
  Burgos
  Celta Vigo
  Cartagena
  Granada
  Mataró
  Mirandés
  Osasuna
  Ponferradina
  Recreativo de Huelva
  Real Madrid
  Real Murcia
  Real Oviedo
  Real Valladolid  (Until 2022 - 2023 season)
  Real Zaragoza
 Sweden
  Djurgården
  Norrköping
  Östersund
  Sundsvall
 Switzerland
  Grasshopper
  Servette
 Turkey
  Beşiktaş
 Vatican
  Rappresentativa OPBG

North America

 Canada
  Toronto FC II
 Dominican Republic
  Cibao FC
 Jamaica
  Harbour View
 Mexico
  UANL
 Trinidad and Tobago
  W Connection
 United States and Canada
  MLS - all teams
 United States
  Atlanta United 2
  Charlotte Independence
  Detroit City FC
  LA Galaxy II
  Loudoun United FC
  Louisville City FC
  New York Red Bulls II
  North Carolina FC
  OKC Energy FC
  Orlando City B
  Philadelphia Union II
  Phoenix Rising FC
  Pittsburgh Riverhounds SC
  Portland Timbers 2
  Real Monarchs
  Richmond Kickers
  Tacoma Defiance
  Sporting Kansas City II

South America

 Argentina
  Boca Juniors
  Deportivo Riestra
  River Plate
 Brazil
  Atlético Mineiro
  Cruzeiro
  Flamengo
  Internacional
  São Paulo
 Chile
  Colo-Colo
  Fernández Vial
  Santiago City FC
  Universidad de Chile
 Colombia
  Independiente Medellín 
  Junior 
  Millonarios
 Ecuador
  Emelec
 Peru
  Sporting Cristal
 Uruguay
  Club Nacional de Football (From 2023/24 season)

Players

Africa

Algeria
  Foued Kadir
  Saphir Taïder
  Yassine Benzia
Cameroon
  Jacques Zoua
Côte d'Ivoire
  Salomon Kalou
  Franck Kessie
Comoros
  Kassim Abdallah
DR Congo
  Chancel Mbemba

Egypt
  Mohamed Salah
  Mohamed Elneny

Ghana
  Thomas Partey
  Richmond Boakye
  Asamoah Gyan
  Jonathan Mensah
  Isaac Vorsah
Morocco
  Achraf Hakimi
  Abderrahim Achchakir
  Oussama Assaidi
  Michaël Chrétien Basser
  Younès Belhanda
  Mounir El Hamdaoui
  Abdelhamid El Kaoutari
  Adil Hermach
Nigeria
  Dickson Nwakaeme
  Emmanuel Ekpo
  Kenneth Omeruo
  Kalu Uche
Senegal
  Khouma Babacar
  Cheikhou Kouyaté
  Cheikh N'Doye
  Moussa Sow
  Ousseynou Thioune
Togo
  Assimiou Touré

Tunisia
  Hannibal Mejbri

Asia

China
  Hao Junmin
  Rong Hao
  Wu Xi
  Yu Dabao
  Yu Hai
  Zhao Xuri
Hong Kong
  Lee Hong Lim
  Lo Kwan Yee
India
  Robin Singh
  Rowllin Borges
  Sandesh Jhingan
Indonesia
  Raphael Maitimo
  I Made Wirawan
  Ricardo Salampessy
  Muhammad Taufiq
  Novan Sasongko
  Ramdhani Lestaluhu
Iran
  Steven Beitashour
  Alireza Jahanbakhsh
  Mehdi Taremi

Japan
  Shinji Kagawa
  Nikki Havenaar
  Yasuyuki Konno
  Hiroshi Kiyotake
  Tomoaki Makino
  Yoshinori Muto
  Shunsuke Nakamura
  Shunsuke Nakatake
  Gaku Shibasaki
  Takashi Usami
  Takumi Minamino
  Takefusa Kubo

South Korea
  Son Heung-min
  Hong Jeong-ho
  Jung Sung-ryong
  Koo Ja-cheol
  Lee Myung-joo
  Lee Seung-woo
  Park Jong-woo
Lebanon
  Abbas Atwi
  Haitham Faour
  Walid Ismail
  Mootaz Jounaidi
  Hassan Maatouk
  Akram Moghrabi
  Ahmad Zreik
Maldives
  Mohamed Arif
  Rilwan Waheed
  Assad Abdul Ghanee
  Akram Abdul Ghanee
  Ahmed Imaaz
  Assadhulla Abdulla
  Ahmed Thoriq
Philippines
  Daisuke Sato
Qatar
  Ahmed Alaaeldin
Saudi Arabia
  Waleed Abdullah
  Taisir Al-Jassim
  Abdulellah Al-Malki
Thailand
  Anon Amornlerdsak
  Anthony Ampaipitakwong
  Chalermpong Kerdkaew
  Chaowat Veerachat
  Kawin Thamsatchanan
  Jakkaphan Kaewprom
  Mika Chunuonsee
  Narubadin Weerawatnodom
  Sanrawat Dechmitr
  Sarawut Masuk
  Supachai Jaided
  Elias Dolah

Europe

Albania
  Elseid Hysaj
Armenia
  Mauro Guevgeozián
  Aras Özbiliz
  Henrikh Mkhitaryan
Austria
  David Alaba
  Guido Burgstaller
  Michael Gregoritsch
  Martin Hinteregger
  Veli Kavlak
  Stefan Lainer
  Valentino Lazaro
  Sebastian Prödl
  Louis Schaub
  Peter Žulj
Azerbaijan
  Renat Dadashov
Belgium
  Michy Batshuayi
  Massimo Bruno
  Ritchie De Laet
  Guillaume Gillet
  Faris Haroun
  Jonathan Legear
  Maxime Lestienne
  Ilombe Mboyo
  Thomas Meunier
  Obbi Oularé
Bosnia and Herzegovina
  Edin Džeko
  Sead Kolašinac
  Senad Lulić
  Miralem Pjanić
  Ibrahim Šehić
Croatia
  Milan Badelj
  Alen Halilović
  Ivo Iličević
  Andrej Kramarić
  Ivan Močinić
  Mario Pašalić
  Ivan Rakitić
  Ante Vukušić
Czech Republic
  Tomáš Necid
  Tomáš Pekhart
Denmark
  Uffe Bech
  Andreas Christensen
  Pierre-Emile Højbjerg
  Kasper Kusk
  Jannik Vestergaard
England
  Dele Alli
  Jamie Vardy
  Declan Rice  
  Callum Hudson-Odoi
  Reiss Nelson 
  Dwight McNeil 
  Jude Bellingham 
  Leighton Baines
  Elliott Bennett
  Baily Cargill
  Zach Clough
  Jack Cork
  Scott Dann
  Stewart Downing
  Brendan Galloway
  Kieran Gibbs 
  Demarai Gray 
  Matt Grimes 
  Bradley Johnson
  Phil Jones
  Henri Lansbury
  Jamie Paterson
  Nick Powell
  Patrick Roberts
  Jay Rodriguez
  Luke Shaw
  Theo Walcott
  Danny Welbeck 
  Emile Smith Rowe
  Harry Winks
  Tucker Quinn
Estonia
  Henri Anier
  Ken Kallaste
  Henrik Ojamaa
Finland
  Niklas Moisander
  Joel Pohjanpalo
  Teemu Pukki
France
  Paul Pogba
  Karim Benzema
  N'Golo Kanté
  Houssem Aouar
  Moussa Dembélé
  André-Pierre Gignac
  Matteo Guendouzi
  Thomas Lemar
  Hatem Ben Arfa
  Jimmy Briand
  Mohamed Chemlal
  Maxwel Cornet
  Mathieu Debuchy
  Abdoulaye Doucouré
  Lamine Gassama
  Yoan Gouffran
  Clément Grenier
  Timothée Kolodziejczak
  Marvin Martin
  Soualiho Meïté
  Jérémy Ménez
  Opa Nguette
  Benjamin Pavard
  Sacha Boey
  Wesley Saïd
  Moussa Sissoko
  Florian Thauvin
  Rayan Cherki
  Jules Koundé
Georgia
  Valeri Kazaishvili
  Levan Kenia
Germany
  Toni Kroos
  Timo Werner
  Serge Gnabry
  Alexandra Popp
  Simone Laudehr
  Leonardo Bittencourt
  Thomas Dähne
  Julian Draxler
  Annike Krahn
  Marvin Friedrich
  Gianluca Gaudino
  Timo Gebhart
  Leon Goretzka
  Mats Hummels
  Christoph Kramer
  Max Kruse
  Sebastian Maier
  Thomas Müller
  Manuel Neuer
  Lukas Podolski
  Marc Rzatkowski
  Anja Mittag
  Marc-André ter Stegen
Gibraltar
  Adam Priestley
Greece
  Kostas Fortounis
  Kostas Mitroglou
  Sotiris Ninis
  Sokratis Papastathopoulos
  Panagiotis Tachtsidis
  Georgios Masouras
  Kostas Tsimikas
  Christos Tzolis
  Dimitris Giannoulis
  Marios Vrousai
  Dimitris Pelkas
  Sotiris Alexandropoulos
  Anastasios Chatzigiovanis
  Fotis Ioannidis
  Efthymis Koulouris
Hungary
  Péter Gulácsi
Republic of Ireland
  Greg Cunningham
  Andy Keogh
  Anthony Pilkington
Iceland
  Alfreð Finnbogason
  Kolbeinn Sigþórsson
Italy
  Andrea Belotti
  Ciro Immobile
  Moise Kean
  Cristiano Biraghi
  Giacomo Bonaventura
  Davide Calabria
  Antonio Candreva
  Gianluca Caprari
  Andrea Conti
  Domenico Criscito
  Bryan Cristante
  Patrick Cutrone
  Mattia De Sciglio
  Lorenzo De Silvestri
  Emanuele Giaccherini
  Roberto Inglese
  Lorenzo Insigne
  Mattia Perin
  Andrea Poli
  Giuseppe Rossi
  Stefano Sturaro
  Davide Zappacosta
Kosovo
  Besart Berisha
Netherlands
  Georginio Wijnaldum
  Steven Bergwijn
  Daley Blind
  Arnaut Danjuma
  Luuk de Jong
  Siem de Jong
  Marten de Roon
  Stefano Denswil
  Denzel Dumfries
  Urby Emanuelson
  Jorrit Hendrix
  Jerry St. Juste
  Davy Pröpper
  Jaïro Riedewald
  Kenny Tete
  Jens Toornstra
  Maarten Stekelenburg
  Donny van de Beek
  Marco van Ginkel
  Ruud Vormer
Northern Ireland
  Ryan McGivern
North Macedonia
  Goran Pandev
Norway
  Abdisalam Ibrahim
  Morten Gamst Pedersen
  Per Ciljan Skjelbred
Poland
  Łukasz Fabiański
  Patryk Małecki
  Adam Matuszczyk
  Krzysztof Piątek
Portugal
  Daniel Bragança
  João Félix
  Raphaël Guerreiro
  Pedro Gonçalves
  Gonçalo Inácio
  Diogo Jota
  Rony Lopes
  João Moutinho
  Nani
  Rui Patrício
  Paulinho
  Renato Sanches
  Nuno Santos
  Adrien Silva
  Bernardo Silva
Romania
  Costel Pantilimon
  Ștefan Radu
Russia
  Aleksei Miranchuk
  Roman Pavlyuchenko
  Roman Shishkin
Scotland
  Kieran Tierney
  Scott McTominay
  Billy Gilmour
  George Boyd
  Kirk Broadfoot
  James Forrest
  Charlie Mulgrew
  Matt Phillips
Serbia
  Luka Jović
  Neven Subotić
Slovakia
  Ondrej Duda
  Stanislav Šesták
  Miroslav Stoch
Slovenia
  Armin Bačinović
  Vid Belec
  Samir Handanović
  Kevin Kampl
  Andraž Kirm
  Etien Velikonja
  Haris Vučkić
Spain
  Isco
  Álvaro Morata
  Jordi Alba
  César Azpilicueta
  Juan Bernat
  Alberto Bueno
  José Callejón
  Samu Castillejo
  Athenea del Castillo
  Sergio Canales
  Diego Costa
  David de Gea
  Aleix García
  Javi García
  José Luis Gayà
  Irene Guerrero
  Ander Herrera
  Asier Illarramendi
  Juanmi
  Mapi León
  Fernando Llorente
  Javi Martínez
  Juan Mata
  Santi Mina
  Martín Montoya
  Alberto Moreno
  Munir
  Nacho
  Irene Paredes
  Dani Parejo
  Pedri
  Francisco Portillo
  Sergio Rico
  Robert
  José Rodríguez
  Pablo Rodriguez
  Sandro
  Roberto Soldado
  Cristian Tello
  Thiago
  Ferran Torres
  Jonathan Viera
Sweden
  Alexander Isak
  Niklas Bärkroth
  Patrik Carlgren
  Albin Ekdal
  Samuel Holmén
  Mikael Ishak
  Martin Lorentzson
  Robin Quaison
  Tobias Sana
  Christian Rubio Sivodedov
  Robin Söder
  Ola Toivonen
  Pontus Wernbloom
Switzerland
  Gelson Fernandes
  Pajtim Kasami
  Valentin Stocker
  Gaëlle Thalmann
  Silvan Widmer
Turkey
  Colin Kazim-Richards
  Mehmet Ekici
  Serdar Özkan
Ukraine
  Andriy Pyatov
Wales
  Gareth Bale
  Ben Davies
  Chris Gunter
  Adam Matthews
  Aaron Ramsey
  Daniel James

North America 

Canada
  Jacob Lensky
  Samuel Piette
Costa Rica
  Keylor Navas
  Alejandro Alpízar
  Walter Centeno
  Luis Diego Cordero
  José Miguel Cubero
  Júnior Díaz
  Óscar Duarte
  David Guzmán
  Bryan Ruiz
  Yeltsin Tejeda
Honduras
  Andy Najar
Jamaica
  Darren Mattocks
Mexico
  Marco Fabián
  Monica Flores
  Andrés Guardado
  Miguel Layún
  Diego Lainez
  Javier Hernández
  Carlos Vela
  Héctor Moreno
  Orbelín Pineda
  Isaác Brizuela
  Rafael Baca
  Katty Martínez
  Stephany Mayor
  César Montes
  Carlos Guzmán
  Javier Cortés
  Luis Fernando Fuentes
  Silvana Flores
  Erick Gutiérrez
  Jana Gutiérrez
  Rodolfo Pizarro
  Oswaldo Alanís
  Jocelyn Orejel
  José Antonio Rodríguez
  Bianca Sierra
United States
  Juan Agudelo
  Jozy Altidore
  Kenny Cooper
  Maurice Edu
  Alecko Eskandarian
  Omar Gonzalez
  Julian Green
  Brad Guzan
  Sacha Kljestan
  Pablo Mastroeni
  Jack McInerney
  Khiry Shelton
  Marvell Wynne
  DeAndre Yedlin
  Gyasi Zardes
  Graham Zusi
  Morgan Brian
  Lori Chalupny
  Heather O'Reilly
  Christie Rampone
  Becky Sauerbrunn
  Emily Sonnett
  Lindsey Horan

Oceania

Australia
  Mustafa Amini
  Terry Antonis
  Milos Degenek
  Eugene Galekovic
  Curtis Good
  Mile Jedinak
  Archie Thompson
  James Troisi
  Dario Vidošić
  Luke Wilkshire
New Zealand
  Leo Bertos

South America

Argentina 
  Lionel Messi
  Paulo Dybala
  Javier Burrai
  Luciano Abecasis
  Hernán Barcos
  Giovani Lo Celso
  Gonzalo Bergessio
  Lucas Biglia
  Sebastián Blanco
  César Carranza
  Emiliano Martínez
  Federico Carrizo
  Fede Cartabia
  Lucas Castro
  Ángel Correa
  Ángel Di María
  Federico Fernández
  Daniel Islas
  Carlos Izquierdoz
  Erik Lamela
  Maxi López
  Jesús Méndez
  Walter Montillo
  Lucas Ocampos
  Diego Perotti
  Eduardo Salvio
  José Sosa
  Matías Suárez
  Fernando Tissone
  Leonel Vangioni
  Luciano Vietto
Bolivia
  Marcelo Moreno
Brazil
  Gabriel Jesus
  Roberto Firmino
  Gabriel Martinelli
  Dani Alves
  Ademilson
  Felipe Anderson
  Bilica
  Fabiana
  Gabriel
  Guilherme Biteco
  Gabriel Boschilia
  Rodrigo Caio
  Fernando Canesin
  Rafael Carioca
  Jean Deretti
  Diego
  Fernando
  Filipe Luís
  Arthur Gomes
  Henrique
  Hernane
  Hernanes
  Jádson
  Kóki
  Lucas Moura
  Marcelo
  Diego Maurício
  Bruno Mendes
  Miranda
  Nathan
  Nenê
  Thiago Neves
  Oscar
  Osvaldo
  Rômulo
  Sandro
  Wallace
Chile
  Gabriel Arias
  Claudio Bravo
  Gary Medel
  Nicolás Castillo
  Brayan Cortés
  Luis Pedro Figueroa
  Pablo Galdames
  Nicolás Guerra
  Pedro Pablo Hernández
  Johnny Herrera
  Manuel Iturra
  Gonzalo Jara
  Francisco Sierralta
  Luis Antonio Jiménez
  Guillermo Maripán
  Jean Meneses
  Rodrigo Millar
  Rafael Olarra
  Esteban Pavez
  José Manuel Rojas
  Felipe Seymour
Colombia
  James Rodríguez
  Abel Aguilar
  Santiago Arias
  Pablo Armero
  Deivy Balanta
  Éder Álvarez Balanta
  Edwin Cardona
  Juan Cuadrado
  Pedro Franco
  Teófilo Gutiérrez
  Harrison Mojica
  Jhonnier Montaño
  Fredy Montero
  Dayro Moreno
  Juanjo Narváez
  David Ospina
  Cristian Palomeque
  Juan Pablo Pino
  Adrián Ramos
  Andrés Rentería
  Wason Rentería
  Macnelly Torres
  Andrés Correa
  Juan Camilo Zúñiga
Ecuador
  Piero Hincapié
  Felix Torres
  Angel Mena
  Byron Castillo
  Jeremy Sarmiento
  Alexander Domínguez
Paraguay
  Antolín Alcaraz
  Víctor Cáceres
  Nicolás Martínez
  Antonio Sanabria
Peru
  Santiago Acasiete
  Cristian Benavente
  Rinaldo Cruzado
  José Carlos Fernández
  Raúl Fernández
  John Galliquio
  Salomón Libman
  Luis Llontop
  Santiago Ormeño
  Andy Polo
  Alberto Rodríguez
  Raúl Ruidíaz
  Rainer Torres
  Jean Tragodara
  Walter Vílchez
  Carlos Zambrano
Uruguay
  Rodrigo Bentancur
  Lucas Torreira
  Abel Hernández
  Juan Manuel Olivera
  Manuel Ugarte
  Mauricio Victorino
  Sebastián Rodríguez
Venezuela
  Fernando Amorebieta
  Rolf Feltscher
  César González
  Juanpi
  Giancarlo Maldonado
  Angelo Peña
  Tomás Rincón
  Luis Manuel Seijas
  Franco Signorelli

Notable Former Players

  Pablo Aimar
  Esteban Cambiasso
  José Chamot
  Hernán Crespo
  Martín Demichelis
  Ezequiel Lavezzi
  Pedro Massacessi
  Diego Milito
  Gabriel Milito
  Juan Pablo Sorín
  Fernando Redondo
  Juan Román Riquelme
  Maxi Rodríguez
  Walter Samuel
  Javier Saviola
  Juan Sebastian Verón
  Santiago Solari
  Javier Zanetti
  Paul Agostino
  Mark Bosnich
  Steve Corica
  John Filan
  Steve Horvat
  Harry Kewell
  Paul Okon
  Nicky Rizzo
  Tony Vidmar
  Ilgar Gurbanov
  Vincent Kompany
  Gert Verheyen
  Kyle Lightbourne
  Hasan Salihamidžić
  Marco Etcheverry
  Giovane Élber
  Juninho
  Kaká
  Lúcio
  Zé Roberto
  Dimitar Berbatov
  Joseph-Désiré Job
  Patrick Mboma
  Marc-Vivien Foe
  Sun Jihai
  An Qi
  Paulo Wanchope
  Ibrahima Bakayoko
  Bonaventure Kalou
  Kolo Touré
  Didier Zokora
  Robert Kovač
  Petr Čech
  Vladimír Šmicer
  Daniel Zítka
  Jesper Grønkjær
  Ebbe Sand
  Edison Méndez
  Nick Barmby
  David Beckham
  Marcus Bent
  Ashley Cole
  Joe Cole
  Pauline Cope
  Jermain Defoe
  Lee Dixon
  Kieron Dyer
  Les Ferdinand
  Steven Gerrard
  Paul Ince
  Ledley King
  Frank Lampard
  Nigel Martyn
  Gary Neville
  Phil Neville
  Nigel Reo-Coker
  Kieran Richardson
  Shaun Wright-Phillips
  Scott Sellars
  Teddy Sheringham
  Ellen White
  Jussi Jääskeläinen
  Jari Litmanen
  Mika Nurmela
  Mika Väyrynen
  Fabien Barthez
  Laurent Blanc
  Djibril Cisse
  Olivier Dacourt
  Marcel Desailly
  Didier Deschamps
  Bruno N'Gotty
  Stéphane Guivarc'h
  Philippe Mexès
  Michel Platini
  David Trezeguet
  Willy Sagnol
  Patrick Viera
  Zinedine Zidane
  Kakha Kaladze
  Michael Ballack
  Franz Beckenbauer
  Lars Bender
  Sven Bender
  Fredi Bobic
  Jérémie Bréchet
  Sebastian Deisler
  Stefan Effenberg
  Bodo Illgner
  Jens Jeremies
  Oliver Kahn
  Philipp Lahm
  Andreas Möller
  Gerd Müller
  Mesut Özil
  Simon Rolfes
  Matthias Sammer
  Mehmet Scholl
  Bernd Schuster
  André Schürrle
  Bastian Schweinsteiger
  Alexander Zickler
  Christian Ziege
  Samuel Kuffour
  Sotiris Alexandropoulos
  Angelos Charisteas
  Dimitris Salpingidis
  Giourkas Seitaridis
  Carlos Ruiz
  Mohammed Sylla
  Gábor Király
  Damien Duff
  Steve Finnan
  Shay Given
  Matt Holland
  Jeff Kenna
  Hermann Hreiðarsson
  Massimo Ambrosini
  Attilio Lombardo
  Riccardo Montolivo
  Christian Panucci
  Del Piero
  Daniele De Rossi
  Alessandro Nesta
  Micah Hyde
  Yoshikatsu Kawaguchi
  Naoki Matsuda
  Tsuneyasu Miyamoto
  Kōji Nakata
  Hiroshi Nanami
  Alessandro Santos
  George Weah
  José Manuel Abundis
  Alberto Garcia Aspe
  Luis Pérez
  Aaron Galindo
  Jaime Lozano
  Ramón Morales
  Ricardo Osorio
  Juan Pablo Rodríguez
  Gonzalo Pineda
  José de Jesús Corona
  Giovanni Van Bronckhorst
  Edwin van der Sar
  Patrick Kluivert
  Jan Kromkamp
  Roy Makaay
  Marc Overmars
  Robin van Persie
  Michael Reiziger
  Arjen Robben
  Clarence Seedorf
  Jaap Stam
  Peter van Vossen
  Celestine Babayaro
  Isaac Okoronkwo
  Sunday Oliseh
  Efe Sodje
  Neil Lennon
  Harald Brattbakk
  Thomas Myhre
  Morten Gamst Pedersen
  John Arne Riise
  Egil Østenstad
  Édgar Barreto
  Aldo Bobadilla
  Carlos Bonet
  Nelson Cuevas
  Cristian Riveros
  Nelson Valdez
  Justo Villar
  Jayo
  Claudio Pizarro
  Nolberto Solano
  Jerzy Dudek
  Emmanuel Olisadebe
  Hugo Almeida
  Vítor Baía
  Paulo Bento
  Rui Bento
  Ricardo Carvalho
  Sérgio Conceição
  Fernando Couto
  Rui Costa
  Paulo Ferreira
  Nuno Gomes
  Nuno Morais
  Fábio Paím
  Petit
  João Pinto
  Ricardo Rocha
  Simão Sabrosa
  Nuno Santos
  Tiago
  Hugo Viana
  José Luís Vidigal
  Florin Cernat
  Cristian Chivu
  Iulian Filipescu
  Adrian Iencsi
  Adrian Mutu
  Dmitri Bulykin
  Andrei Karyaka
  Oleg Luzhny
  Andrei Smetanin
  Yegor Titov
  Mohammed Ameen
  Saleh Al-Saqri
  Redha Tukar
  Diego Mejía
  John Collins
  Paul Dalglish
  Paul Dickov
  Barry Ferguson
  Paul Hartley
  James McFadden
  Ray Montgomerie
  Steven Thompson
  Papa Bouba Diop
  El Hadji Diouf
  Amdy Faye
  George Lui
  Klemen Lavrič
  Amir Karić
  Aleksander Knavs
  Milenko Ačimovič
  Zlatko Zahovič
  Mark Fish
  Pierre Issa
  Ricardo Katza
  Papi Khomane
  Mbulelo Mabizela
  Phil Masinga
  Benni McCarthy
  Thabo Mngomeni
  Steven Pienaar
  Benedict Vilakazi
  Kim Chi-gon
  Kim Do-heon
  Kim Dong-jin
  Cha Du-ri
  Lee Eul-yong
  Lee Ho
  Choi Jin-cheul
  Kim Jin-kyu
  Kim Young-chul
  Cho Won-hee
  Choi Won-kwon
  Abelardo
  David Albelda
  Xabi Alonso
  Santiago Cañizares
  Iker Casillas
  José Francisco Molina
  Dani García
  Fernando Hierro
  Albert Luque
  Carlos Marchena
  Fernando Morientes
  Raúl
  Fernando Torres
  Diego Tristan
  Manolo Sanchís
  David Silva
  Xavi
  Vicente
  David Villa
  Antonio Adán
  Patrik Andersson
  Niclas Alexandersson
  Fredrik Berglund
  Magnus Hedman
  Pontus Kåmark
  Tobias Linderoth
  Teddy Lučić
  Olof Mellberg
  Hakan Mild
  Henrik Larsson
  Stefan Schwarz
  Christian Wilhelmsson
  Tranquillo Barnetta
  Ricardo Cabanas
  Stephane Chapuisat
  Bernt Haas
  Christoph Spycher
  Murat Yakin
  Ramon Vega
  Johann Vogel
  Riadh Bouazizi
  Radhi Jaïdi
  Jawhar Mnari
  Hamed Namouchi
  Karim Saidi
  Francileudo Santos
  Hatem Trabelsi
  Hamit Altıntop
  Yıldıray Baştürk
  Hakan Çalhanoğlu
  Arif Erdem
  Rüştü Reçber
  Selçuk Şahin
  Tuncay Şanlı
  Tayfun Korkut
  Carlos Edwards
  Russell Latapy
  Stern John
  Dennis Lawrence
  Silvio Spann
  Aurtis Whitley
  Diego Forlan
  Jorge Fucile
  Pablo García
  Diego Lugano
  Juan Cruz Mascia
  Andrés Scotti
  Bruno Silva
  Darío Silva
  Oleksandr Holovko
  Serhiy Rebrov
  Vitaliy Reva
  Anatoliy Tymoshchuk
  Oleh Venhlinskyi
  Andriy Vorobey
  Andriy Voronin
  Jeff Agoos
  Conor Casey
  Steve Cherundolo
  Bobby Convey
  Brad Friedel
  Cory Gibbs
  John Harkes
  Eddie Lewis
  Pablo Mastroeni
  Clint Mathis
  Pat Noonan
  Eddie Pope
  Predrag Radosavljević
  Steve Ralston
  Claudio Reyna
  Kerry Zavagnin
  Saša Ćurčić
  Saša Ilić
  Dragan Stojkovic
  Juan Arango
  Gerzon Chacón
  Rafael Dudamel
  Alejandro Moreno
  Jorge Rojas
  José Torrealba
  Ronald Vargas
  Leonel Vielma
  Simon Davies
  Richard Duffy
  Carl Fletcher
  Jason Koumas
  Mark Pembridge
  Sam Ricketts
  John Oster

Archery

Teams
  Korea
  Argentina

Artistic gymnastics
  Jake Dalton
  Vanessa Ferrari
  Danell Leyva

Artists

  Naiara Awada
  Camila Mateos
  Abril Sánchez
  Xuxa
  Kris Wu
  Justin Bieber
  Jet Li
  Akhenaton
  Daft Punk
  La Fouine
  Sinik
  Soprano
  Manushi Chhillar
  Ranveer Singh
  Deepika Padukone
  Alexa
  Via Vallen
  Maria Selena
  Judika
  U2
  Exile (Japanese band)
  Menelik Eu'el Solomon
  Fabri Fibra
  Krystal Jung
  Song Min-ho
  Son Naeun
  Rain
  Rainie Yang
  Blackpink
  Alif Satar
  Dhia Azrai
  Hazriq Danish
  Got7
  Triana Park
  Calle 13
  Noize MC
  
  Khemanit Jamikorn
  F2 Freestylers
  Cashtastic
  Jamiroquai
  Liam Gallagher
  Noel Gallagher
  Rita Ora
  Dynamo
  Eddie Kadi
  Guvna B
  Jerome Bailey
  Jungle
  KSI
  Stormzy
  Steve Rushton
  Anna Margaret
  Beyoncé
  B.o.B
  Ciara
  Desiigner
  Fred Durst
  Ghostface Killah
  Hailey Baldwin
  Jonas Brothers
  Jesse McCartney
  Honor Society
  Jessica Simpson
  Kid Cudi
  Karlie Kloss
  Katy Perry
  Kendall Jenner
  Korn
  Kylie Jenner
  Method Man
  Pharrell Williams
  Pusha T
  Redman (rapper)
  Run DMC
  Snoop Dogg
  2 Chainz

Baseball

Players

 Zach Plesac
 Kris Bryant
 Aledmys Diaz
 Carlos Correa
 Coco Crisp
 Carlos Gómez
 Aaron Judge
 Trea Turner
 Josh Harrison
 Alex Bregman
 Justin Upton
 Melvin Upton, Jr.
 Jayson Werth
 Billy Hamilton
 Byron Buxton
 Chase Utley
 Justin Turner
 Tommy Pham
 Aledmys Diaz
 Kevin Pillar
 Marcus Stroman
 Aroldis Chapman
 Cody Star
 Dakota Hudson
 Nicholas Castellanos

Basketball

National teams

  Burkina Faso
  Finland
  Laos
  Mauritius
  Senegal
  Trinidad and Tobago

Associations
  Lebanese Basketball League – all teams
  Association Mauricienne de Basketball – all teams
  Turkish Airlines EuroLeague

Club teams

  River Plate
  Flamengo
  Leones de Quilpué
  Cibona
  Zadar
  Helsinki Seagulls
  Tampereen Pyrintö
  Limoges CSP
  ASVEL Lyon-Villeurbanne
  Paris Basketball
  Strasbourg IG
  Alba Berlin
  FC Bayern Munich
  Panathinaikos
  Hapoel Jerusalem B.C.
  New Basket Brindisi
  Urania Milano
  Pallacanestro Trieste
  Alvark Tokyo
  Busan KT Sonicboom
  Goyang Orions
  Seoul Samsung Thunders
  BK VEF Rīga
  Al Ahed SC
  Al Riyadi
  Hekmeh
  Tebnin SC
  Al Ahli SC (Tripoli)
  Žalgiris
  Sporting Cristal
  Benfica
  Wisła Kraków
  Crvena zvezda
  Mega Bemax
  Cedevita Olimpija
  Gran Canaria
  Real Madrid
  BC Dnipro
  Kyiv-Basket
  ABA C3 Basketball Academy
  Bucaneros de La Guaira
  Saigon Heat

Players

  Dante Exum
  Alan Ledesma
  Thon Maker
  Bruno Caboclo
  Luc Mbah a Moute
  Andrew Wiggins
  Logan Apfelbeck
  Mia Fraser
  Serge Ibaka
  Bojan Bogdanović
  Dragan Bender
  Erik Murphy
  Nando de Colo
  Nicolas Batum
  Frank Ntilikina
  Guerschon Yabusele
  Omri Casspi
  Luigi Datome
  Danilo Gallinari
  Kristaps Porziņģis
  Donatas Motiejūnas
  Steven Adams
  Nemanja Bjelica
  Nemanja Nedović
  Ognjen Kuzmić
  Goran Dragić
  Ricky Rubio
  Willy Hernangómez
  Ersan İlyasova*
  Alec Burks
  Anthony Edwards
  Austin Rivers
  Avery Bradley
  Ben McLemore
  Brandon Ingram
  Brandon Knight
  Candace Parker
  Chris Copeland
  Corey Brewer
  CJ Watson
  Damian Lillard
  Darren Collison
  David Nwaba
  DeMarre Carroll
  Derrick Favors
  Derrick Rose
  Devin Harris
  Donovan Mitchell
  Eric Gordon
  Evan Mobley
  Fred VanVleet
  Iman Shumpert
  Jalen Suggs
  Jamal Crawford
  James Harden
  Jerryd Bayless
  John Wall
  Jordan Adams
  Justise Winslow
  Kenneth Faried
  Kevon Looney
  Kyle Anderson
  Kyle Lowry 
  Kyle O'Quinn
  Larry Nance Jr.
  Lonnie Walker IV
  MarShon Brooks
  Nick Young
  Patrick Beverley
  Perry Jones
  Peyton Siva
  Quincy Acy
  Robin Lopez
  Rodney Stuckey
  Sebastian Telfair
  Shabazz Muhammad
  Tim Frazier
  Tony Allen
  Tony Snell
  Trae Young
  Ty Lawson
  Tyshawn Taylor
  Tyler Zeller
  John Collins

Former players
  Joel Embiid
  Jamal Murray
  José Calderón
  Chandler Parsons
  Chauncey Billups
  David West
  Dwight Howard
  Gilbert Arenas
  Jaylen Brown
  Kareem Abdul-Jabbar
  Kevin Garnett
  Kobe Bryant
  Marcus Smart
  Patrick Ewing
  Tim Duncan
  Tracy Mcgrady
  Zach LaVine

Boxing
   Arthur Abraham
  Lovlina Borgohain
  Nikhat Zareen
  Simranjit Kaur
  Sadaf Khadem
  Kell Brook
  Chris Algieri
  Anthony Yarde
  Olajide Olayinka Williams "JJ" Olatunji

Cricket

National teams
 (From June 2023)

Club teams
  Nottinghamshire
  South East Stars
  Surrey

Players

 Adam Zampa
 Ellyse Perry
 Mahmudullah
 Mustafizur Rahman
 Tamim Iqbal
 Jofra Archer
 Tom Banton
 Stuart Broad
 Sam Curran
 Tom Curran
 James Anderson
 Liam Livingstone
 Ben Stokes
 Stuart Meaker
 David Willey
 Chris Woakes
 Kuldeep Yadav
 Manjot Kalra
 Rishabh Pant
 Rohit Sharma
 Paras Khadka
  Adam Milne
  Neil Wagner
  Tim Southee
 Azhar Ali
 Wahab Riaz 
  Colin Ingram
  Kagiso Rabada
  Vishwa Fernando
 Alzarri Joseph
 Chris Gayle
 Darren Bravo
 Stafanie Taylor

Esports

Club teams 

 00 Nation DNB
 19esports
 AFC Ajax eSports
 AYM Esports
 Boca Juniors Gaming
 Dplus KIA
 DUX Gaming
 exeed
 Grow uP Esports
 LDLC OL
 Pampas
 River Plate Gaming

Players 
 Gotaga
 Luva de Pedreiro
 Ninja

Fencing

Players
  Valentina Vezzali
  Giovanna Trillini
  Aldo Montano

Associations
  U.S. Fencing Association
  Fédération Française
  Korean Fencing Federation

Field hockey

National teams
  England
  Netherlands
  Bangladesh
  Malaysia

Club teams

 River Plate
 Universidad de Chile
 Beeston HC
 Reading HC
 Harvestehuder THC
 Nürnberger THC
 Rot-Weiss Koln
 Uhlenhorster HC
 HC Bra
 CUS Cagliari Hockey
 Tenaga Nasional Berhad HC
 Hofstra University
 WC Eagles

Players

 Richard Mantell
 Simon Mantell
 Barry Middleton
 Joseph Meakin
 Moritz Fuerste
 Manpreet Singh
 Faizal Saari
 Muhammad Amin Rahim
 Azlan Misron
 Naomi van As
 Taeke Taekema
 Alessandro Barco
 Francesco Guiggi
 Giorgio Conti

Figure skating
 Alexandra Trusova
 Rika Kihira 
 Tessa Virtue
 You Young

Futsal

National teams

Club teams

Europe
Italy

  Ciampino Aniene AnniNuovi Calcio a 5

Golf

Players

Men

  Andrés Romero
  Nick Taylor
  Joaquín Niemann
  Li Haotong
  Rasmus Højgaard
  Tyrrell Hatton
  Adrián Otaegui
  Retief Goosen
  Jim Furyk
  David Lipsky
  Collin Morikawa
  Sean O'Hair
  Xander Schauffele
  Aaron Wise

Women
  Paula Creamer
  Natalie Gulbis
  Danielle Kang

Handball

Associations
 EHF Champions League

National teams

Club teams

Europe

  Bjerringbro-Silkeborg
  Silkeborg-Voel KFUM (women's)
  TSV Hannover-Burgdorf
  CYEB-Budakalász
  Kisvárda (women's)
  Nyíradony (women's)
  Nyírbátor
  Nyíregyháza
  MOL-Pick Szeged
  SPR Pogoń Szczecin
  Zagłębie Lubin
  Vistal Gdynia
  Potaissa Turda
  Celje Pivovarna Laško
  Ricoh HK
  Ystads IF HF

Ice hockey

Leagues
 National Hockey League (All teams)
 Canadian Hockey League (All teams)

Players

 Patrice Bergeron
 Brock Boeser
 Brent Burns
 Sidney Crosby
 P. K. Subban
 Connor McDavid

Lacrosse
  National Lacrosse Classic
  Premier Lacrosse League
  Myles Jones

Motorsport 
  Kyler Brack
  Nelson Piquet
  Robert Wickens
  Chase Elliott
  Dale Earnhardt Jr.
  Brad Keselowski
  Fernando Alonso
  Antonio García
  Nick Tandy

North American colleges and universities 

  Alabama State Hornets and Lady Hornets
  Alcorn State Braves and Lady Braves
  Alliance Warriors
  Alma Scots
  American International Yellow Jackets
  Andrews University Cardinals
  Arizona State Sun Devils
  Arkansas–Pine Bluff Golden Lions
  Arkansas State Red Wolves
  Augusta Jaguars
  Biola Eagles
  Bob Jones Bruins
  Boston College Eagles
  BRCC Bears
  Brewton–Parker Barons
  Bucknell Bison
  California Baptist Lancers
  Cal State San Bernardino Coyotes
  Central Michigan Chippewas
  Centre Colonels
  Chaminade Silverswords
  Chattanooga Mocs
  Chicago Maroons
  The Citadel Bulldogs
  Coast Guard Bears
  Concordia Golden Eagles
  Copiah–Lincoln Wolf Pack
  Delaware Fightin' Blue Hens
  Dillard Bleu Devils and Lady Bleu Devils
  Dominican Penguins
  Dominican Stars
  Drake Bulldogs
  DuPage Chaparrals
  East Carolina Pirates
  Eastern Illinois Panthers
  Eastern Kentucky Colonels
  Eastern Michigan Eagles
  Eastern Washington Eagles
  Emporia State Hornets
  Endicott Gulls
  FIU Panthers
  Florida Atlantic Owls
  Franciscan Barons
  Fresno Pacific Sunbirds
  Fresno State Bulldogs
  GMC Bulldogs
  Georgia Southern Eagles
  Georgia Southwestern State Hurricanes
  Georgia Tech Yellow Jackets
  George Mason Patriots
  George Washington Colonials
  Grambling State Tigers
  Grand Valley State Lakers
  Green Bay Phoenix
  Guelph Gryphons
  Hawaii Rainbow Warriors and Rainbow Wahine
  High Point Panthers
  Holy Cross Crusaders
  Holy Names Hawks
  Hope Flying Dutchmen
  Howard Payne Yellow Jackets
  Incarnate Word Cardinals
  Idaho State Bengals
  Illinois Tech Scarlet Hawks
  Iowa Western Reivers
  Indiana Hoosiers
  Iona Gaels
  IUPUI Jaguars
  Jacksonville State Gamecocks
  Jamestown Jimmies
  Kansas Jayhawks
  Kansas City Roos
  Kennesaw State Owls
  Kentucky Christian Knights
  La Salle Explorers
  La Sierra Golden Eagles
  Laval Rouge et Or
  Lewis Flyers
  Life Running Eagles
  Limestone Saints
  Longwood Lancers
  Louisiana Ragin' Cajuns
  Louisiana–Monroe Warhawks
  Louisiana Tech Bulldogs and Lady Techsters
  Louisville Cardinals
  Loyola Marymount Lions
  Lyndon State Hornets
  Malone Pioneers
  McGill Redbirds and Martlets
  Memorial Sea-Hawks
  Mercer Bears
  Merchant Marine Mariners
  Miami Hurricanes
  Miami RedHawks
  Milwaukee Panthers
  Mississippi State Bulldogs
  Missouri State Bears and Lady Bears
  Montclair State Red Hawks
  Montreal Carabins
  Mount Holyoke Lyons
  Mount Olive Trojans
  MUW Owls
  NC State Wolfpack
  Nebraska Cornhuskers
  Nevada Wolf Pack
  Newberry Wolves
  Nicholls Colonels
  NJIT Highlanders
  North Alabama Lions
  North Dakota Fighting Hawks
  Northern Arizona Lumberjacks
  Northern Illinois Huskies
  Northern Kentucky Norse
  Northwestern State Demons and Lady Demons
  Northwest Missouri State Bearcats
  Occidental Tigers
  Ohio Bobcats
  Omaha Mavericks
  Ontario Tech Ridgebacks
  Ottawa Braves
  Point Skyhawks
  Prairie View A&M Panthers
  Presbyterian Blue Hose
  Quinnipiac Bobcats
  Rhode Island Rams
  Rice Owls
  Richmond Spiders
  Rider Broncs
  Rutgers–Newark Scarlet Raiders 
  Rutgers Scarlet Knights 
  Sacramento State Hornets
  Sacred Heart Pioneers
  St. Bonaventure Bonnies
  Saint Peter's Peacocks 
  STAC Spartans
  Salem State Vikings
  San Diego Christian Hawks
  San Jose State Spartans
  Seattle Redhawks
  Shorter Hawks
  SIU Edwardsville Cougars
  SRU Rocks
  Sonoma State Seawolves
  South Alabama Jaguars
  South Dakota Coyotes
  Southeastern Fire
  South Florida Bulls
  Southern Indiana Screaming Eagles
  Southern Miss Golden Eagles and Lady Eagles
  Southern Utah Thunderbirds
  Southern Wesleyan Warriors
  Southwestern Michigan Roadrunners
  Stonehill Skyhawks
  Taft Cougars
  Tennessee Tech Golden Eagles
  Texas A&M Aggies
  Texas A&M–Corpus Christi Islanders
  Texas A&M International Dustdevils
  Texas A&M–Kingsville Javelinas
  Texas–Permian Basin Falcons
  Texas State Bobcats
  Troy Trojans
  Truett McConnell Bears
  TSC Scorpions
  Tulsa Golden Hurricane
  UBC Thunderbirds
  UC Davis Aggies
  UC Irvine Anteaters
  UC Merced Golden Bobcats
  UC Riverside Highlanders
  UC Santa Barbara Gauchos
  UIC Flames
  UMass Minutemen and Minutewomen
  UNC Asheville Bulldogs
  UPEI Panthers
  Utah Valley Wolverines
  UTSA Roadrunners
  UVI Buccaneers and Lady Buccaneers
  Wabash Little Giants
  Washington Huskies
  Weber State Wildcats
  West Alabama Tigers
  West Georgia Wolves
  Western Illinois Leathernecks
  Western Michigan Broncos
  Western Oregon Wolves
  Westminster Griffins
  Winnipeg Wesmen
  Winthrop Eagles
  Wofford Terriers
  Wooster Fighting Scots
  Wyoming Cowboys and Cowgirls
  Xavier Gold Rush and Gold Nuggets
  York Lions
  Young Harris Mountain Lions

Student-athlete NIL deals 
Adidas signed 16 female student-athletes to NIL (name, image, and likeness) deals for the 2022–23 school year. All except Rose Zhang, who was signed separately from the others, are attending schools that have apparel deals with the company.

Flags listed here indicate the hometowns of students, not the locations of their schools.
  Maddy Anderson, Mississippi State Bulldogs soccer
  Brianna Copeland, Indiana Hoosiers softball
  Lauren Dooley, Kansas Jayhawks volleyball
  Kinsey Fielder, Washington Huskies softball
  Jayci Goldsmith, Texas A&M Aggies tennis
  Nicklin Hames, Nebraska Cornhuskers volleyball
  Jameese Joseph, NC State Wolfpack soccer
  Emily Mason, Rutgers Scarlet Knights soccer
  Erin Moss, Georgia Tech Yellow Jackets volleyball
  Moriah Oliviera, Miami Hurricanes track
  Gianna Pielet, Texas A&M Aggies tennis
  Izzy Redmond, Arizona State Sun Devils gymnastics
  Jaiden Thomas, NC State Wolfpack soccer
  Hailey Van Lith, Louisville Cardinals basketball
  India Wells, Grambling State Lady Tigers softball
  Rose Zhang, Stanford Cardinal golf

Rugby League

Clubs teams

Players
 Nathan Cleary
 Nick Cotric
 Jarrod Croker
 Billy Slater
 Mark Gasnier
 Josh Dugan
 Josh Mansour
 Latrell Mitchell
 Beau Ryan
 Ryan Papenhuyzen

Rugby Union

National teams
 Czech Republic
 New Zealand

Clubs Teams

 Brive
 La Rochelle
 Perpignan
 Leinster
 Munster
 Black Rams Tokyo
 Kobelco Kobe Steelers
 NTT DoCoMo Red Hurricanes Osaka
 Shining Arcs Tokyo-Bay Urayasu
 Tokyo Sungoliath
 Toyota Verblitz
 Blues
 Chiefs
 Crusaders
 Highlanders
 Hurricanes

Players

  Patricio Albacete
  Felipe Contepomi
  Rodrigo Roncero
  Leonardo Senatore
  Rory Arnold
  Luke Burgess
  Matt Giteau
  Will Genia
  Dane Haylett-Petty
  Sekope Kepu
  Tevita Kuridrani
  Scott Sio
  James Slipper
  Matt To'omua
  Scott Fardy
  Jonny Wilkinson
  Delon Armitage
  Matt Banahan
  Danny Cipriani
  Tom Croft
  George Ford
  Tom Curry
  Dan Hipkiss
  Charlie Hodgson
  Charlie Sharples
  Andrew Sheridan
  Phil Vickery
  Ben Youngs
  Elliot Daly
  Manu Tuilagi
  Mako Vunipola
  Jamie George
  Courtney Lawes
  Anthony Watson
  Jonny Hill
  Tom Curry
  Ben Curry
  Marcus Smith
  Mathieu Bastareaud
  Yann David 
  Ibrahim Diarra
  Yannick Jauzion
  Lionel Nallet
  Pascal Papé
  Morgan Parra
  Dimitri Szarzewski
  Guilhem Guirado
  Rabah Slimani
  Sébastien Vahaamahina
  Grégory Alldritt
  Antoine Dupont
  Romain Ntamack
  Virimi Vakatawa
  Damian Penaud
  Camille Chat
  Cyril Baille
  Rory Best
  Tony Buckley
  Keith Earls
  Cian Healy
  Denis Leamy
  Conor Murray
  Seán O'Brien
  Paul O'Connell
  Brian O'Driscoll
  Ronan O'Gara
  Johnny Sexton
  Gareth Steenson
  Eoin Reddan
  David Wallace
  CJ Stander
  Iain Henderson
  Robbie Henshaw
  Jack Conan
  Rónan Kelleher
  Tadhg Furlong
  Andrew Porter
  Mauro Bergamasco
  Mirco Bergamasco
  Martin Castrogiovanni
  Andrea Lo Cicero
  Andrea Marcato
  Matteo Pratichetti
  Josh Sole
  Taine Randell
  Jonah Lomu
  Kees Meeuws
  Dan Carter
  Jimmy Cowan
  Carl Hayman
  Marty Holah
  Doug Howlett
  Leon MacDonald
  Byron Kelleher
  Richie McCaw
  Kieran Read
  Aaron Cruden
  Aaron Smith
  Ma'a Nonu
  Joe Rokocoko
  Tana Umaga
  Rodney So'oialo
  Beauden Barrett
  Jordie Barrett
  Reuben Thorne
  Sam Whitelock
  Ali Williams
  Brodie Retallick
  Sonny Bill Williams
  Jerome Kaino
  Victor Vito
  Tony Woodcock
  Israel Dagg
  John Barclay
  Johnnie Beattie
  Mike Blair
  Max Evans
  Ross Ford
  Richie Gray
  Jim Hamilton
  Andrew Henderson
  Alastair Kellock
  Rory Lamont
  Rory Lawson
  Simon Taylor
  Nikki Walker
  Jason White
  Finn Russell
  Ali Price
  Patrick Lambie
  Jean de Villiers
  Jaque Fourie
  Bryan Habana
  Derick Hougaard
  Ricky Januarie
  Ruan Pienaar
  JP Pietersen
  John Smit
  François Steyn
  CJ van der Linde
  Joe van Niekerk
  Herschel Jantjies
  Pieter-Steph du Toit
  Siya Kolisi
  Malcolm Marx
  Steven Kitshoff
  Frans Malherbe
  Franco Mostert
  Damian Willemse
  Vladimir Ostroushko
  Alexander Yanyushkin
  Todd Clever
  Rodrigo Capo Ortega
  Dan Biggar
  Rhys Patchell
  Lee Byrne
  Luke Charteris
  Alex Cuthbert
  Chris Czekaj
  Gareth Delve
  Ian Evans
  James Hook
  Tom James
  Gethin Jenkins
  Adam Jones
  Alun Wyn Jones
  Stephen Jones
  Matthew Morgan
  George North
  Michael Phillips
  Jason Tovey
  Sam Warburton
  Gareth Anscombe
  Liam Williams
  Owen Watkin
  Wyn Jones
  Tomas Francis
  Rhys Carré
  Dillon Lewis
  Adam Beard
  Ross Moriarty
  Louis Rees-Zammit

Skateboarding

  Dennis Durrant
  Kurt Winter
  Klaus Bohms
  Rodrigo "TX" Teixeira
  Kevin Lowry
  Benny Fairfax
  Chewy Cannon 
  Blondey McCoy
  Mike Arnold 
  Raul Navarro
  Lucas Puig
  Dennis Busenitz
  Lem Villemin
  Günes Ozdogan
  Alec Majerus
  Mark Gonzales
  Mark Suciu
  Nestor Judkins 
  Nora Vasconcellos
  Pete Eldridge
  Silas Baxter-Neal
  Christopher Chann
  Na-Kel Smith
  Lu Huynh
  Tyshawn Jones
  Marc Johnson
  Daewon Song

Snowboarding 

  Jake Blauvelt
  Kazuhiro Kokubo
  Eric Jackson
  Louif Felix Paradis
  Keegan Valaika
  Forest Bailey
  Helen Schettini
  Alexander Tank

Alpine Skiing 
  Mikaela Shiffrin

Swimming

  Britta Steffen
  Ian Thorpe
  Paolo Bossini
  Coralie Balmy
  Hugues Duboscq
  Helge Meeuw
  Michael Andrew
  Allison Schmitt
  Marco Koch
  Kyle Chalmers
  Josh Prenot

Tennis

National Teams 
  Korea

Players

  Federico Coria
  Paula Ormaechea
  Francisco Cerúndolo
  Tamira Paszek
  Dominic Thiem
  Thomaz Bellucci
  Felix Auger Aliassime
  Cristian Garín (to 2022)
  Wang Qiang
  Peng Shuai
  Karolína Muchová
  Clara Tauson
  Anett Kontaveit (to 2019)
  Clara Burel
  Jonathan Eysseric
  Hugo Gaston
  Kristina Mladenovic
  Guillaume Rufin
  Gilles Simon
  Jo-Wilfried Tsonga
  Angelique Kerber
  Andrea Petkovic
  Alexander Zverev
  Mischa Zverev
  Andy Murray (to 2014)
  Heather Watson (to 2012)
  Stefanos Tsitsipas
  Maria Sakkari
  Sania Mirza
  Siddhant Banthia
  Zeel Desai
  Ayumi Morita
  Naomi Osaka (to 2019)
  Elena Rybakina
  Chung Yun-seong
  Ernests Gulbis
  Jeļena Ostapenko (to 2022)
  Thiemo de Bakker
  Thomas Schoorel
  Ana Bogdan (to 2021)
  Sorana Cîrstea (to 2016)
  Petru-Alexandru Luncanu
  Elena-Gabriela Ruse
  Raluca Olaru
  Anna Kalinskaya
  Daria Kasatkina
  Alexandra Panova
  Anastasia Pavlyuchenkova (to 2018)
  Vera Zvonareva (to 2008)
  Garbiñe Muguruza
  Fernando Verdasco
  Kaja Juvan
  Belinda Bencic (to 2015)
  Rebecca Peterson
  Louisa Chirico
  Caty McNally
  Jessica Pegula
  Noah Rubin

Retired players

  Alicia Molik
  Nikola Hofmanova
  Barbara Schett
  Justine Henin
  Marcos Daniel
  Tiago Fernandes
  Nicolas Massú
  Matias Sborowitz
  Yen-Hsun Lu
  Caroline Wozniacki
  Nicolás Lapentti
  Daniel Brands
  Steffi Graf
  Florian Mayer
  Flavia Pennetta
  Kimiko Date-Krumm
  Julia Glushko
  Dan King-Turner
  Maria Kirilenko
  Anna Kournikova
  Dinara Safina
  Mikhail Youzhny
  Anabel Medina Garrigues
  Ana Ivanovic
  Daniela Hantuchová
  Martina Hingis
  Patty Schnyder
  Carly Gullickson
  Jamie Hampton
  Ashley Harkleroad
  Gigi Fernández
  Jamea Jackson
  Vic Seixas

Events
  Roland Garros (until 2018)
  Mexican Open

Track and field

National teams
  Ethiopia
  France
  Greece
  Panama
  Romania
  Saint Kitts and Nevis
  Slovak Republic
  South Africa

Individuals 
  Hima Das
  Bendere Oboya
  Shaunae Miller-Uibo
  Steven Gardiner
  Kendra Harrison
  Noah Lyles

Volleyball

Associations
 USA Volleyball
 British Volleyball Federation
 2014 World Championship

National teams
  Burundi
  China
  Egypt
  Poland
  Uganda

Club Teams
  Volley Bergamo (since 2019/2020 season).
  Power Volley Milano
  BluVolley Verona
  Zenit Kazan

Athletes
  Earvin N'Gapeth
  Ivan Zaytsev
  Matt Anderson
  Thomas Jaeschke
  Jordan Larson
  Dustin Watten

Wrestling

National teams

  Italy
  Turkey

Other Adidas sponsorships 
 Title sponsor for the Vancouver Marathon during 2001–2005 (since been taken over by the Bank of Montreal, though the marathon is still presented by Adidas)
 Sponsor of the France Football European Team of the Year since 1968 to 1990.
 Official sponsor for the Boston Marathon since 1988.
 Sponsor of San Francisco's Zazzle Bay to Breakers footrace
 Secondary sponsor of Fernando Alonso in Formula One
 Wah Yan College, Kowloon, HK
The college received jackets and other suits from Adidas.
 Western Carolina University "Pride of the Mountains" Marching Band. The band received 410 Adidas track suits, personalized with the "Pride of the Mountains" Logo.
 Official sponsor for Kian Golpira in Adidas Kickboxing line.
 Sponsorship of Wojbethelnation2nd (group of comedians/sports-lovers involving Jordan Wojciechowski, David Bethel, and Avery Warner).
 Official sponsor for the Campioni per la ricerca since 2016.
 Official sponsor of Sport Mediaset since 2016.
 Professional Video Gaming (eSports) organizations Team Vitality, DWG KIA and G2

See also
 List of Puma sponsorships
 List of Nike sponsorships
 List of ASICS sponsorships
 List of Under Armour sponsorships

References

Sponsorships
Adidas